St. Paul's Church (Danish: Sankt Pauls Kirke) is a Lutheran church in central Copenhagen, Denmark, also colloquially known as Nyboder's Church due to its location in the middle of the Nyboder area. It was designed by Johannes Emil Gnudtzmann and constructed from 1872 to 1877.

History
 
The church is part of a wave of church constructions which took place in Copenhagen in the 1870s to provide capacity for the city's growing population. Unlike the other new churches – St. Stephen's and St. James' in Østerbro and St. Mathew's in Vesterbro – St. Paul's was not built in one of the emerging districts outside the city's old fortifications which had just been decommissioned. Johannes Emil Gnudtzmann was charged with the design of the new church, his first independent work as an architect, and it opened on 15 February 1877.

Architecture

The church is built in red brick and the masonry is decorated with blinds, arches, columns and pinnacles on all corners.

Interior
The church's first altarpiece was a painting by Hendrick Krock entitled The Eucharist (Danish: Nadveren). In 1887 it was replaced by a gilded crucifix created by the sculptor Jens Adolf Jerichau, a donation from pastor Christian Møller.

Organs
The church has two organs. The main organ has 42 voices and 3126 pipes, three manuals and pedal. Originally built by the organ builder Daniel Köhne in 1878 with 20 voices, and rebuilt and enlarged by I. Starup & Søn in 1926 and 1938 respectively. The choir organ is built by the Dutch organ builder Henk Klop in 2000. Frederik Magle is organist since 2017.

St. Paul's Square

The space surrounding the church is called Sankt Pauls Plads (St. Paul's Square). On the southeast side of the church (even numbers) are some of the so'called Grey Tows of the Nyboder development. They were designed by Olaf Schmidth and are younger than the more well-known terraces of the neighbourhood. On the other side of the church street (even numbers) are a row of apartment buildings from the 1870s. To the rear of the church is the former Gernersgade Barracks, now Bygningskulturens Hus. Two of Nyboder's Yellow Rows flank Adelgade in front of the church.

See also

 Architecture of Denmark

References

External links
 Official website

Lutheran churches in Copenhagen
19th-century Church of Denmark churches
Churches completed in 1877
19th-century Lutheran churches
Churches in the Diocese of Copenhagen
1877 establishments in Denmark